Total Pop! The First 40 Hits is a greatest hits collection from Erasure, released on 23 February 2009 by Mute Records. The album utilizes a straightforward format: all of Erasure's singles up to that point, sequenced in chronological order.  This is a continuation of the format used in Erasure's 1992 hits collection Pop! The First 20 Hits.

The album was released in a variety of formats: a standard 2-CD set containing the 40 hits, a deluxe 3-CD/DVD longbox set containing the 40 hits, along with live performances from 1987 to 2007, and appearances at the BBC from 1986 to 2005. The digital download version of the album contains three additional bonus 'hits'.

Prior to its release, a remix album titled Pop! Remixed was released on 9 February 2009.

A free four-track digital download titled Pop! Treasure, which features previously unreleased material, was made available to those who pre-ordered the box set via the Erasure online shop.

The album entered the UK Albums Chart at number 21 and at number 12 in Argentina. Mute later issued disc two separately as Pop2! The Second 20 Hits.

Track listing

Pop! (CD disc 1)

Pop2! (CD disc 2)

Erasure Live 1987–2007 (CD disc 3, "deluxe" edition only)
 all songs written by Clarke/Bell unless otherwise noted.
 "Spiralling" (The Circus Tour) 1987
 "The Hardest Part" (The Innocents Tour) 1988
 "Drama!" (The Wild! Tour) 1989
 "Knocking on Your Door" (The Wild! Tour) 1989
 "Push Me Shove Me" (Milton Keynes Bowl) 1990
 "Voulez-Vous" (Phantasmagorical Tour) 1992, (Benny Andersson, Björn Ulvaeus)
 "Am I Right?" (Phantasmagorical Tour) 1992
 "Heart of Stone" (Phantasmagorical Tour) 1992
 "Who Needs Love Like That" (The Tiny Tour) 1996
 "Rain" (Cowboy Tour) 1997
 "Everybody's Got to Learn Sometime" (Sanctuary The EIS Christmas Concert) 2002 (James Warren)
 "Piano Song" (The Other Tour) 2003
 "Hideaway" (The Erasure Show) 2005
 "Breathe" (The Acoustic Tour) 2006
 "Oh L'Amour" (Light at the End of the World Tour) 2007

Erasure at the BBC 1986-2005 (DVD disc 4, "deluxe" edition only)

 "Sometimes" (Top of the Pops) 4 Dec 1986
 "It Doesn't Have to Be" (The Tom O'Connor Roadshow) 2 Mar 1987
 "Victim of Love" (Daytime Live) 22 Oct 1987
 "The Circus" (Daytime Live) 22 Oct 1987
 "Ship of Fools" (Wogan) 26 Feb 1988
 "Chains of Love" (Top of the Pops) 16 Jun 1988
 "A Little Respect" (Going Live!) 15 Oct 1988
 "Stop!" (Top of the Pops) 15 Dec 1988
 "Chorus" (Wogan) 28 Jun 1991
 "Love to Hate You" (Top of the Pops) 3 Oct 1991
 "Am I Right?" (Top of the Pops) 5 Dec 1991
 "Breath of Life" (Top of the Pops) 26 Mar 1992
 "Who Needs Love Like That" (Top of the Pops) 29 Oct 1992
 "Always" (Top of the Pops) 7 Apr 1994
 "Run to the Sun" (Top of the Pops) 28 Jul 1994
 "I Love Saturday" (Smash Hits Poll Winner's Party) 4 Dec 1994
 "Stay with Me" (Pebble Mill) 30 Nov 1995
 "Fingers & Thumbs (Cold Summer's Day)" (Pebble Mill) 30 Nov 1995
 "Don't Say Your Love Is Killing Me" (Top of the Pops) 7 Mar 1997
 "Solsbury Hill" (Top of the Pops) 17 Jan 2003
 "Breathe" (Top of the Pops) 14 Jan 2005
 Top of the Pops 2 Special (Top of the Pops 2) 9 Apr 2003
"Breath of Life"
"Sometimes"
"Love to Hate You"
"You've Lost That Lovin' Feelin'" (Phil Spector, Barry Mann, Cynthia Weil)
"A Little Respect"
"Make Me Smile (Come Up and See Me)" (Steve Harley)
 "Sometimes" (The Tom O'Connor Roadshow) 2 Mar 1987
 "How Many Times?" (The Late Show) 18 Oct 1989
 "Miracle" (Later... with Jools Holland) 21 May 1994
 "Because You're So Sweet" (Later... with Jools Holland) 21 May 1994

Pop2! (digital download only)
 "Oh L'amour" (August Mix)
 "Boy" (Acoustic)
 "All This Time Still Falling Out of Love"

Pop! Treasure (pre-order of "deluxe" edition only; download)
 "Sugar Hill" (Vox)
 "Worlds on Fire" (Alternative Vocals)
 "Chains of Love" (Other People's Songs Version)
 "Early Bird" (Demo without Cyndi Lauper vocals)

Charts

References

2009 greatest hits albums
2009 live albums
Erasure compilation albums
Albums produced by Flood (producer)
Albums produced by Stephen Hague
Albums produced by Mark Saunders (record producer)
Albums produced by Gareth Jones (music producer)
Mute Records compilation albums
Mute Records live albums